The Rio Group (G-Rio) was a permanent association of political consultation of Latin America and Caribbean countries, created in Rio de Janeiro, Brazil on December 18, 1986 with the purpose of creating a better political relationship among the countries. It was succeeded in 2011 by the Community of Latin American and Caribbean States

The first countries to be members of this organization were Argentina, Brazil, Colombia, Mexico, Panama, Peru, Uruguay, and Venezuela, the same members of the Contadora Group (Mexico, Colombia and Panama) and the Contadora Support Group (Argentina, Brazil, Peru, and Uruguay) which is also known as the Group of Lima or Group of Eight. The purpose of this group was to strengthen the political relationships and some issues among Latin American and Caribbean countries, this group was based on consultations of common interest such as the Latin American unity, by 2010 the Rio Group was composed by 23 countries and 1 representative from the Eastern Caribbean. On July 29, 1985, Argentina, Peru, and Uruguay announced the creation of the Contadora Support Group or Lima Group, which together with the Contadora Group was known as the Group of Eight.

In 1983, the governments of Mexico, Colombia, Panama, and Venezuela established a system to promote peace in Central America. On June 6, 1986, The Central American countries visited Panama and signed the Contadora Act for peace and cooperation of Central America in which they signed to strengthen peace and cooperation among the peoples of the region and improve political confidence among the Central American countries caused by border incidents such as the arms race, arms trafficking, among others. this was also signed to restore economic development and cooperation in Central America and thus be able to negotiate better access to international markets.

Goals 

 Political cooperation among the governments of member countries.
 Examine and solve international issues.
 Promote the best function and coordination of Latin American organizations.
 Present solutions for problems that affect the region.
 Improving inter-American relations.
 New fields of cooperation that favor economic, social, scientific and technological development.

Member states

Member states/organizations in alphabetical order by column:

List of summit meetings

Institutional Ministerial Meetings with the European Union 
The Rio Group and the European Union maintains an institutionalized dialogue, based on the 1990 Rome Declaration.

Rio Group ministers meet in Brasilia
Foreign ministers of the group of Rio gathered for a two-day meeting to discuss issues including the political situation in Haiti, and to make preparations for the group's 18th summit set for November 4–5. During the meeting, Celso Amorim said that the Brazilian troops are taking part in the United Nations Stabilization Mission for Haiti (MINUSTAH). He discussed the integration of South and Latin America, and said that the Rio Group could play an important role in facilitating the reinsertion of Cuba into the family of Latin America.

Amorim also said “The Group of Rio has developed its capability to address new issues, mostly economic and cooperation ones, and is now serving as an important mechanism for dialogue.”

During the meeting in Nov 4-5 in Rio de Janeiro, the group discuss the effects of globalization on Latin America countries. By this time Rio Group compromises 19 countries, including Argentina, Bolivia, Chile, Colombia, Costa Rica, Dominican Republic, Ecuador, El Salvador, Guatemala, Honduras, Mexico, Nicaragua, Panama, Paraguay, Peru, Uruguay, and Venezuela.

The Cancun Summit and the renovation of Rio Group

Carlos Federico Domínguez Ávila
During the meeting of presidents of Latin America and the Caribbean in Cancun, Mexico, the presidents discussed the renewal and recomposition  of the Permanent Mechanism for Consultation and Political Coordination, also known as the Rio Group. The Rio Group was created in 1986 in Rio de Janeiro, Brazil by representatives of eight countries, by 2010 the Rio Group was composed by 23 countries and 1 representative from the Eastern Caribbean. One of the most important virtues of the Rio Group was Meridian 47n. 115, Feb.2010 [p. 27-28] the only Political and diplomatic forum that brings together all 33 states that make up “America”.

See also
 Organization of American States
 Union of South American Nations
 Organization of Ibero-American States
 Ibero-American Summit
 Inter-American Treaty of Reciprocal Assistance

References

Intergovernmental organizations established by treaty
Organizations based in Latin America
Organizations established in 1986
1986 in South America
1986 in the Caribbean